Siddi is a village development committee in Chitwan District in the Narayani Zone of southern Nepal. At the time of the 1991 Nepal census it had a population of 2,577 people living in 404 individual households.

References

Populated places in Chitwan District
Village development committees (Nepal)